Ernest Green could refer to: 

Ernest Green (born 1941), American civil rights activist
Ernie Green (born 1938), American football player
E. G. Green (Ernest G. Green III) (born 1975), American football player

See also
Washed Out (Ernest Weatherly Greene Jr.) (born 1982), American musician